Critical value may refer to:

In differential topology, a critical value of a differentiable function  between differentiable manifolds is the image (value of) ƒ(x) in N of a critical point x in M.

In statistical hypothesis testing, the critical values of a statistical test are the boundaries of the acceptance region of the test. The acceptance region is the set of values of the test statistic for which the null hypothesis is not rejected. Depending on the shape of the acceptance region, there can be one or more than one critical value. 

In complex dynamics, a critical value is the image of a critical point.

In medicine, a critical value or panic value is a value of a laboratory test that indicates a serious risk to the patient. Laboratory staff may be required to directly notify a physician or clinical staff of these values.

References

Multivariable calculus
Differential topology
Critical phenomena